is a railway station on the Jōban Line in Arakawa, Tokyo, Japan, operated by East Japan Railway Company (JR East).

Lines
Mikawashima Station is served by the Jōban Line.

Station layout

The station consists of a single island platform serving two tracks.

History
Mikawashima Station opened on 1 April 1905.

Accident

On 3 May 1962, there was a crash between a freight train and two passenger trains which resulted in 160 deaths and 296 injuries. The crash occurred about 350 meters east of Mikawashima Station when an Ueno-bound passenger train (train number 2000H) crashed into the wreckage of a crash between a Toride-bound passenger train (2117H) and a Mito-bound freight train (number 287) as well as a crowd of evacuating passengers from 2117H.

Surrounding area
Shim-Mikawashima Station (Keisei Main Line)

References

External links

 Mikawashima Station (JR East) 

Railway stations in Tokyo
Jōban Line
Arakawa, Tokyo
Railway stations in Japan opened in 1905